This is a list of mammals of Maryland, those mammals native to or immediately off the coast of the U.S. state of Maryland.

Maryland does not have a designated state mammal, but does designate the Calico cat as its state cat, the Chesapeake Bay Retriever as its state dog, and the Thoroughbred as its state horse. Seven species of mammals in Maryland have been extirpated: the eastern wolf, elk, American bison, cougar, snowshoe hare, American marten and eastern harvest mouse. Additionally, some have been introduced. The coypu, an invasive species, has since been extirpated through culling efforts.

Didelphimorphia

Chiroptera

Eulipotyphla

Lagomorpha

Rodentia

Cetacea

Sirenia

Carnivora

Artiodactyla

References

External links 
 https://dnr.maryland.gov/wildlife/Pages/plants_wildlife/Mammals.aspx
 https://msa.maryland.gov/msa/mdmanual/01glance/wildlife/mammals/html/mammals.html

mammals
Maryland